José Galimberti (born 15 January 1896) was a Brazilian athlete. He competed in the men's shot put and the men's discus throw at the 1924 Summer Olympics.

References

External links
 

1896 births
Year of death missing
Athletes (track and field) at the 1924 Summer Olympics
Brazilian male shot putters
Brazilian male discus throwers
Olympic athletes of Brazil
Place of birth missing